Weihui railway station is a station on Beijing–Guangzhou railway in Weihui, Xinxiang, Henan.

History
The station was established in 1904.

See also 

 Weihui South railway station

References

Railway stations in Henan
Stations on the Beijing–Guangzhou Railway
Railway stations in China opened in 1904